The 2019 Liga 4 was the first season of fourth-tier football in Georgia under its current title. There were ten clubs participating in it. The matches started on 2 April and ended on 18 November.

Teams

The league was formed by four relegated teams from Liga 3, four promoted teams from Regionuli Liga and two winners of play-off ties between these two division members. They took part in a single three-round competition.

League table

References

External links
Georgian Football Federation

Liga 4 (Georgia) seasons
4
Georgia
Georgia